Umberto Notari (1878-1950) was an Italian journalist, writer, and editor.

Bibliography 

 Quelle signore (Scene di una grande città moderna) - Milan 1904
 Femmina (Scene di una grande capitale) - Milan 1906
 I tre ladri (Mio zio miliardario) - Koschitz, Milan 1907
 Dio contro Dio (Il maiale nero): documenti e rivelazioni - Milan 1908
 Con la mano sinistra - Lettere aperte a Vittorio Emanuele III - Milan 1908
 Noi - Etica e dinamica dell'Associazione Italiana di Avanguardia - Milan 1910
 Fufù (Un terrorista) - Milan 1910
 L'ubriaco (commedia in tre atti) - Milan 1915
 La prima sassata (commedia sarcastica) - Milan 1920
 Bàsia, ovvero le ragazze allarmanti - Milan 1928
 La fatica nuziale - Milan 1928
 Il turbante violetto - Milan 1928
 Vita dei rosicanti (I celibatari) - Milan 1928
 Signora "900" - Milan 1929
 La donna "tipo tre" - Milan 1929 (riediz. 1998)
 Il podestà dagli occhi aperti - Milan 1930
 Le due monete - Milan 1930
 Meridiano di Roma - Milan 1930
 L'elixir di lunga Italia - Milan 1930
 Il giocatore di bridge - Milan 1931
 Luce dal sud - Milan 1931
 Il coltello in bocca - Milan 1932
 L'arte di bere - Milan 1933
 I leoni e le formiche - Milan 1933
 Dichiarazioni alle più belle donne del mondo - Bompiani, Milan 1933
 L'arte di fumare - Milan 1934
 I pifferi di Ginevra - Milan 1936
 Il signor Geremia - Milan 1936
 Vieni in Italia con me - Milan 1937
 Autarchia contro xenolatria. A che gioco giochiamo? - Milan 1938
 Panegirico della razza italiana - Milan 1939

Literary References

Notari's work "Il Maiale Nero," or, "The Black Pig," is discussed in the classic American novel, A Farewell to Arms.

See also
A Farewell to Arms

Italian male writers
1878 births
1950 deaths